Port Harcourt International Airport  is an international airport located in Omagwa, a suburb of Port Harcourt, the capital city of the Rivers State in Nigeria.  The airport has two terminals for both international and domestic flights. The new International terminal was commissioned by the executive president of the Federal Republic of Nigeria President Muhammadu Buhari on 25 October 2018. In 2009, the airport served 1,081,587 passengers, making it the third-busiest airport in Nigeria.

History
On 18 August 2006, the airport was closed for repairs. The Nigerian Civil Aviation Authority stated that the emergency shutdown was in order to overhaul the runway and build a fence around the facility.  Such maintenance had been in planning stages for several months, but an electrical fire on 17 August 2006 made repairs immediately necessary.  All domestic flights were diverted to Sam Mbakwe Airport (Owerri), Akanu Ibiam International Airport (Enugu) and Margaret Ekpo International Airport (Calabar), while international flights were diverted to Nnamdi Azikiwe International Airport (Abuja) or Murtala Mohammed International Airport (Lagos).

Repair work started in January 2007, while re-opening was originally expected to be in August 2007.  In June 2007, work was suspended due to safety concerns of the engineers.

In December 2007, the airport was reopened to a limited capacity. Operations were restricted to daytime until the first quarter of 2008, by which time the new CAT III lighting system became fully operational.

In 2015, the airport gained notoriety for having been declared the worst in the world; amid this, the construction of a new passenger terminal was underway, which later opened in 2018.

Other facilities
The Nigerian Civil Aviation Authority has its Port Harcourt office on the airport grounds.

Airlines and destinations

Passenger

Cargo

Statistics 

These data show number of passengers movements into the airport, according to the Federal Airports Authority of Nigeria's Aviation Sector Summary Reports.

Accidents and incidents
On 17 December 1996, an MK Airlines DC-8-55F arriving from Luxembourg struck trees, landed short of the runway and burned. All four crew survived.
On 27 November 2001, an MK Airlines Boeing 747-200F crashed in bad weather on short final to Port Harcourt International Airport, killing one crew member. Nigeria's Ministry of Aviation, produced a Civil Aviation Accident Report (FMA/AIPB/389) that found the pilot was using a nonstandard final approach on autopilot below 2000 feet, contrary to the company's policy.
 On 6 June 2005, an Air France Airbus A330 carrying roughly 200 passengers collided with a herd of cows just after touchdown at Port Harcourt Airport. There were no fatalities on board and the aircraft was not significantly damaged.
On 10 December 2005, Sosoliso Airlines Flight 1145 crashed at Port Harcourt Airport after flying from Nnamdi Azikiwe International Airport in Abuja. Of 110 passengers and crew on board, there were only two survivors.
 On 22 June 2019, an Air Peace Boeing 737 with 87 passengers and 6 crew from Abuja to Port Harcourt exited the runway while landing in heavy rain and came to rest in soft mud.

See also
Transport in Nigeria
List of airports in Nigeria

References

External links

Port Harcourt Airport at OurAirports

Airports in Rivers State
Buildings and structures in Port Harcourt